The 13th Annual GMA Dove Awards were held on 1982 recognizing accomplishments of musicians for the year 1981. The show was held in Nashville, Tennessee.

External links
 

GMA Dove Awards
1982 music awards
1982 in American music
1982 in Tennessee
GMA